Srđan Stanić (born 6 July 1989) is a Bosnian professional footballer who plays as a full-back for First League of FBiH club Igman Konjic.

He is well known for winning the Goal of the week video poll on Goal.com ahead of other big names like Zlatan Ibrahimović and Raul for his 35-meter goal against Rudar Prijedor while a part of Željezničar.

Club career

Early career
Stanić started off his professional football career at Sarajevo, before joining the youth team of Slavija Sarajevo in 2005. He made his debut for the first team in 2006. In 2007, he left Slavija.

Željezničar
Shortly after leaving Slavija, in the summer of 2007, Stanić joined Željezničar. While at Željezničar, he won 3 Bosnian Championships and 2 Bosnian Cups, and was also one of the best players of the club at the time. He was also the club captain in 2014.

He left Željezničar in June 2015, 8 years after joining the club.

Olimpik
In mid-2015, Stanić signed with Olimpik as a free agent. In January 2016, he left Olimpik.

Return to Željezničar
On 27 January 2016, Stanić came back to Željezničar and signed a 2 year contract. In July 2016, after Miloš Kostić became the new manager of Željezničar, Stanić was left out of the first team and leaving the club felt like an option, but after Slavko Petrović was named the new manager of the club, the first thing he did was getting Stanić back in to the first team and thus, Stanić stayed at Željezničar.

After almost 2 years in his second stint with Željezničar, he left the club on 29 December 2017.

Zrinjski Mostar
On 5 January 2018, Stanić joined Zrinjski Mostar on a 2 and a half year contract, which was due to keep him at the club until the summer of 2020. On 21 December 2018, Stanić left the club after not having enough playing time.

With Zrinjski, he won the Bosnian Premier League title in the 2017–18 season.

Second return to Željezničar
On 31 January 2019, Stanić, for a second time came back and signed a contract with Željezničar, which was due to keep him at the club until the summer of 2020. He made his third debut for Željezničar in a 1–0 home win against Zvijezda 09 on 17 March 2019, playing the whole 90 minutes of the match. He left the club after his contract expired in August 2020.

Igman Konjic
On 26 September 2020, Stanić signed a contract with First League of FBiH club Igman Konjic. He made his debut only four days later, on 30 September, in a cup match against Velež Nevesinje.

International career
Stanić was part of the Bosnia and Herzegovina U19 national team. On 16 December 2011, he made an appearance for the Bosnia and Herzegovina first team in a 1–0 friendly game loss against Poland.

On 13 May 2014, Stanić was included in the Bosnian national team provisional 2014 FIFA World Cup squad by head coach Safet Sušić, but did not make the final team.

Style of play
Stanić is a long-time versatile player who can play anywhere in midfield, notably on the wings. He has featured as a wing-back on several occasions.

Career statistics

Club

International

Honours
Željezničar 
Bosnian Premier League: 2009–10, 2011–12, 2012–13
Bosnian Cup: 2010–11, 2011–12

Zrinjski Mostar 
Bosnian Premier League: 2017–18

References

External links

Srđan Stanić at Sofascore

1989 births
Living people
Footballers from Sarajevo
Association football fullbacks
Bosnia and Herzegovina footballers
Bosnia and Herzegovina youth international footballers
FK Slavija Sarajevo players
FK Željezničar Sarajevo players
FK Olimpik players
HŠK Zrinjski Mostar players
FK Igman Konjic players
Premier League of Bosnia and Herzegovina players
First League of the Federation of Bosnia and Herzegovina players